The trap bar (also referred to as the hex bar) is an implement used in weight training. It is an assemblage of bars bent into an angle, then welded into a shape which lies flat in a plane, consisting of:
 A barstock welded into a hexagonal or diamond shape, sized to allow a person to stand in the middle
 Two (almost always) coaxial stub bars, welded to opposing positions on the outside of the perimeter of the hollow portion to hold weight plates. The stubs are used for loading the trapbar with plates.
 A set of handles pointing forward and back are welded inside the hollow portion. The handles are used to hold the trapbar while an exercise is performed. Note that these handles are aligned at a 90 degree angle to the plate-loading bars.

The trap bar was invented, patented and trademarked by Al Gerard, a competitive powerlifter. It is often thought to have been named after the (upper fibres of the) trapezius muscles, the muscle it was designed to train, with shoulder shrugs. In addition to shrugs, the bar is also used for trapbar deadlift, trapbar jumps, overhead/military presses, upright rows or "high pulls," and stiff leg deadlifts. However, the original shape was similar to a 'bear trap' when opened, leading to it being referred to as the "trap bar". Its design has since changed from various original designs into a hexagonal shape, and can be correctly referred to as a "hex bar".

Variants are produced by several vendors.

References

Weight training equipment